Friedrich Poitsch (15 October 1926 – 23 January 1999) was a German ice hockey player. He competed in the men's tournament at the 1952 Winter Olympics.

References

External links
 

1926 births
1999 deaths
Ice hockey players at the 1952 Winter Olympics
Olympic ice hockey players of Germany
Sportspeople from Füssen